Edward Pye Chamberlayne, Jr. (March 7, 1938–October 21, 2006), known professionally as Pye Chamberlayne, was an American radio journalist who spent most of his career with UPI Audio, later known as the UPI Radio Network.

Biography

Born in Fredericksburg, Virginia and raised in Richmond and New York City, Chamberlayne learned French in Paris while his father was news editor of the French edition of the New York Herald Tribune.  He received a B.A. degree from the University of Virginia in 1960.

After two years with Agence France-Presse and a summer with The Associated Press, he joined the audio service of United Press International in New York. Transferred quickly to Washington, DC, he covered first the White House and then the U.S. Congress and American politics. He reported on every presidential election from 1964 through 1992 and was at Andrews Air Force Base on the evening of November 22, 1963, when the body of President John F. Kennedy arrived from Dallas. He was a subject of The Boys on the Bus, Timothy Crouse's account of news coverage of the 1972 U.S. presidential campaign.

Chamberlayne lived in Alexandria, Virginia from late 1960s until he retired from UPI in 1999.  In retirement, he moved to Calmes Neck (near Boyce, Virginia).  In 2006, he died at his home in Calmes Neck of a heart attack.

External links
 Chamberlayne Times, personal website
 Clarke Times-Courier:  "Locals may replace out-of-town tax assessors" by Pye Chamberlayne, February 1, 2006
 Living on Earth show transcripts (Google search)
 Downholders (ex-Unipresser website):  End of UPI Radio in 1999

Photos

 Downholders (ex-Unipresser website):  Pye Chamberlayne, UPI Radio's veteran Senate and political reporter, on floor of 1984 Democratic Convention in San Francisco
 Downholders (ex-Unipresser website):  UPI Audio 1982 election night staff in Washington bureau. Left-to-right: Bill Small, Pye Chamberlayne, Bob Hoenig, Rob Navias and Tom Foty

Obituaries
 United Press International
 NPR
 MSNBC
 Washington Post
 Boston Globe
 San Diego Union-Tribune
 Washington Times
 WTOP-FM
 Radio Ink

1938 births
2006 deaths
University of Virginia alumni
American radio journalists
People from Alexandria, Virginia
Journalists from Virginia
20th-century American journalists
American male journalists